Eduardo Luís Carloto (born 4 April 1981) is a Brazilian footballer. He spent his professional career at Italian Lega Pro (3rd & 4th highest division).

Biography
Carloto started his Italy career at Internazionale then Treviso.

In 2002–03 season he left for Serie D side Fanfulla then played for Serie C1 side Paternò. In July 2004 Treviso bought him back and sent him to Vis Pesaro in co-ownership deal. In January 2005 he left for FC South Tyrol.

In 2005–06 season he left for Serie C2 club Giugliano then Carpenedolo of Serie C2 Group A. In January 2007 he left for Benevento of Serie C2 Group C, helping promote the team to Serie C1 scoring 4 goals. After limited chances in 2008, he left for Serie D side Lucchese in December 2008. He helped the team be promoted back to Prima Divisione and made 30 appearances in 2009–10 season (3 in Cup) scoring 2 goals in the domestic league.

In August 2011 he left for Perugia.

On 3 January 2013, he signed for Unione Venezia.

Honours
Seconda Divisione: 2007–08
Serie D: 2008–09
Seconda Divisione: 2009–10
Supercoppa di Lega: 2010

References

External links
  
 
 Profile at AIC.Football.it 

Brazilian footballers
Inter Milan players
Treviso F.B.C. 1993 players
A.S.D. Paternò 1908 players
Vis Pesaro dal 1898 players
Benevento Calcio players
F.C. Südtirol players
S.S.C. Giugliano players
S.S.D. Lucchese 1905 players
A.C. Perugia Calcio players
Association football midfielders
Brazilian expatriate footballers
Expatriate footballers in Italy
Brazilian expatriate sportspeople in Italy
Footballers from Curitiba
1981 births
Living people
A.S.D. Fanfulla players